The Ministry of Housing is a cabinet-level government ministry in Saudi Arabia was established in 2011 by a royal decree and responsible for the supervision of the housing in the Kingdom. The Ministry also stimulate the development of housing products and supplying real estate. The current minister is Majid Al-Hogail who was appointed in July 2015.

Ministry programs 
Since the establishment of the Ministry, it has launched different programs to overcome the issue of housing in the country. Eskan (housing) is one of the main programs that aim of providing citizens with housing products based on some criteria set up by the Ministry. The Ministry claimed that by the year 2018, more than 300,000 housing products are planned to be allocated to beneficiaries through Sakani program. In April 2021, in order to increase the Saudi home ownership to 70% by 2030, the Sakani program launched new services on its application like electronic financing, approved contractor, and interactive maps. In 2018, Housing Minister Majid Al-Hogail handed over the first house built in 48 hours to its owner using a 3D-printed building technology. The housing sector investment in 2019 is expected to reach $21.33 billion according to the housing minister to provide affordable housing units.

References 

Housing
2011 establishments in Saudi Arabia
Saudi
Ministries established in 2011
Ministries disestablished in 2021